François-Edmond Fortier (2 September 1862, Plaine, France – 8 February 1928, Dakar, Senegal) was a French documentary photographer, editor and ethnographer.

He published over 3500 postcards of French West Africa (Afrique Occidentale Française). These were published during his lifetime, with or without his permission, in more than 10 books. Postcards and reprints can be found in several collections all over the world.

Biography

Born in the tiny village of Plaine, France in 1862, François-Edmond Fortier lived for several years in Saint-Louis, Senegal then moved to Dakar in 1900.

In 1902 to 1903, he explored Fouta-Djalon, then Haute-Guinée. In 1905–1906, he travelled in Soudan Français, Kankan, Bamako, Djenné and Tombouctou.

François-Edmond Fortier spent his late years in his shop on the corner of Boulevard Pinet-Laprade/Rue Dagornein the Médina de Dakar. He was a small man, blonde, with little beard "pointu" and always wore a pointed military topi. He had a favourite remark "Le Cantal?… mon berceau, Dakar mon tombeau!"  (The Cantal my cradle, Dakar.. my tomb)

Notes and references

Bibliography 
 DAVID, Phillip. Inventaire général des cartes postales Fortier, 3 vols. Paris: s.n., 1986–1988. .
 DAVID, Phillip. "La carte postale sénégalaise au service de l'Histoire" in Notes Africaines n.79, 1983.
 HICKLING, Patricia. "The Early Photographs of Edmond Fortier: Documenting Postcards from Senegal", African Research and Documentation, 102, 207.
 MOREAU, Daniela & PARES, Luis Nicolau. Imagens Do Daomé - Edmond Fortier E O Colonialismo Francês Na Terra Dos Vodus (1908-1909). São Paulo: Martins Fontes - WMF, 2018.  . 
 MOREAU, Daniela. Edmond Fortier - Viagem A Timbuktu Fotografias Da Africa Do Oeste Em 1906. São Paulo: Literart, 2015. .
 TROLEZ, Gwenaëlle. L'explorateur, le photographe et le missionnaire. Paris: Magellan & Cie, Paris, 2007. .

External links

Centre Edmond Fortier (CEF)
Fortier, un photographe très moderne (texte de Jean-Michel Andrault)

nw url:www.edmondfortier.nl

French photographers
French ethnographers
1862 births
1928 deaths
Documentary photographers
People of French West Africa